The 2021–22 season was Raith Rovers' second season back in the second tier of Scottish football after being promoted from Scottish League One at the end of the 2019–20 season. Raith Rovers also competed in the League Cup, Challenge Cup & the Scottish Cup.

Summary

Management
Raith were led by manager John McGlynn. The 2021–22 season was his fourth season at the club.

Results & fixtures

Friendlies

Scottish Championship

Scottish Cup

Scottish League Cup

Scottish Challenge Cup

Player statistics

Squad 
Last updated 29 April 2022

|}

Disciplinary record
Includes all competitive matches.

Last updated April 2022

Team statistics

League table

League Cup table

Management statistics
Last updated on 29 April 2022

Notes

References

Raith Rovers F.C. seasons
Raith Rovers